Hyman Herman (August 16, 1875 – June 7, 1962) was a geologist and engineer, and was described as the 'father of Yallourn'. He was director of the Victorian Department of Mines and chair of the Government Brown Coal Advisory Committee. He was instrumental in the establishment of the Victorian State Electricity Commission taking a role as engineer for brown coal.

Herman was born at Sandhurst (Bendigo) on 16 August 1875 to Polish father Solomon Herman from Konin, British mother Elizabeth, née Oxlake who migrated to Australia in 1864. He married Florence Leslie Ramsay Salmon 2 April 1902, had three daughters and  died on 7 June 1962.

As chair of the Government  Brown Coal Advisory Committee, which reported in September 1917, he recommended the establishment of an Electricity Commission to develop the brown coal reserves and construct a power station and transmission lines. In December 1918, a Bill was passed establishing the State Electricity Commission of Victoria.

Education

Gravel Hill State School (under scholarships),

Sandhurst Corporate High School,

Scotch College 1890,

D.Sc. (Melbourne, 1924) he submitted 'The Structure of the Bendigo goldfields',

University of Melbourne engineering  1891 -1896.

B.C.E., 1896

Employment

 Geological Survey, Victorian Department of Mines and Water Supply 1895
 acting director of the Geological Survey 1900
 assistant manager Mt Bischoff Tin Mining Co. Waratah.
 private practice Queen Street Melbourne 1907
 company director, consultant manager, Australian Mining Standard correspondent
 director of the Victorian Geological Survey 1912
 chairman of advisory committee on coal and electricity 1917
 engineer SEC brown coal research and briquetting 1920
 advisor to South Australian government on brown coal-mining 1926

Societies
He was a member of the Australasian Institute of Mining Engineers and its president for the year 1914

Commissions and conferences

 Australian Power Survey 1928
 World Power Conference in Washington 1936
 royal commission on Western Australian coal industry 1931, 1933
 consultant engineer S.E.C. 1933-48

Publications

 Brown Coal : with special reference to the State of Victoria, Commonwealth of Australia, State Electricity Commission of Victoria, Melbourne, 1952
 Utilization of brown coal in Victoria Melb. : S.E.C.?
 Report of the Advisory Committee on Brown Coal. Victoria. Advisory Committee on Brown Coal. Melbourne : Government Printer 1917

for a photographic Portrait see Museum Victoria

References

People from Melbourne
1875 births
1962 deaths
Australian engineers
Australian geologists
People from Bendigo
Australian people of Polish descent
University of Melbourne alumni